Hayakuchi Dam is a gravity dam located in Akita Prefecture in Japan. The dam is used for flood control and power production. The catchment area of the dam is 48.5 km2. The dam impounds about 33  ha of land when full and can store 6550 thousand cubic meters of water. The construction of the dam was started on 1969 and completed in 1976.

References

Dams in Akita Prefecture
1976 establishments in Japan